= RCAF Blackouts =

The RCAF Blackouts were a Canadian World War II entertainment group that performed at airbases in Canada and internationally.
